= Otaño =

The surname Otaño derives from the surname ‘Otanović’ which derives from the Serbian region.

== History ==
During the 16th century, the Otanović family resided in the northern part of Serbia (Subotica) which borders Hungary to the north. It is not known if the Otanović family resided in this region prior to the 16th century.

After the loss of independence to the Kingdom of Hungary and the Ottoman Empire, the country of Serbia briefly regained sovereignty under Jovan Nenad in the 16th century. Three Austrian invasions and numerous rebellions left the Otanović family with less than 300 members of the family from killings and a tough decision to make to flee Serbia to Western territories in Europe.

As the Great Serb Migrations depopulated most of Kosovo and Serbia, the Otanović family sought refuge with other Serbs across the Danube river in Vojvodina to the north and Military Frontier in the West where they were granted rights by the Austrian crown under measures such as the Statuta Wallachorum of 1630.

As immigration decreased in the 17th century, the Otanović family migrated to Western territories in search of independence, new territories, and favorable conditions. Most of the Otanović family was of Jewish descent and settled in areas of Holland, France and Germany but were then outcast as the German Protestants sect grew in the territories of Germany and Holland. Generally, they settled in rural areas where they subsisted typically as blacksmiths and farmers.

In France, the Otanović families had the reputation of being exiled royalty. Colonies forced the people out of the country and into northern parts of Spain. This led to the change of the surname Otanović to the Otaño surname in the late 17th century. This change occurred between 1678 and 1684. The change was made when the family settled in the northern regions of Spain and Basque country (Spain/France).

Today, the Otaño surname is a popular one but one that remains tied to the same family tree. Anyone with the last name Otaño falls under the same family tree. Otaño's are found in the USA and Spanish speaking territories such as northern Spain (Asturias, Irun, San Sebastian, Pamplona, Galicia, Basque country, Canary Islands; Fuerteventura region), Puerto Rico (Lares, Rio Piedras, San German, Isabela, Ponce), Cuba (Havana, Pinar Del Río, Cienfuegos) and Argentina (Mar del Plata, Rio Gallegos, Santa Cruz). Otaño's can also be found in southern regions of France (Bayonne, Biarritz, Hendaye, Landes, Pau, Capbreton, Hossegor, Bordeaux, Anglet). Most of the Otaño family reside in regions of southern France and northern Spain and are Roman Catholic and Jewish.
